Zagorskoye is a rural locality (a village) in Baltiysky Selsoviet, Iglinsky District, Bashkortostan, Russia. The population was 48 as of 2010. There are 4 streets.

Geography 
Zagorskoye is located 25 km southeast of Iglino (the district's administrative centre) by road. Zavety Ilyicha is the nearest rural locality.

References 

Rural localities in Iglinsky District